The 1935 All-Southwest Conference football team consists of American football players chosen by various organizations for All-Southwest Conference teams for the 1935 college football season.  The selectors for the 1935 season included the Associated Press (AP).

All Southwest selections

Backs
 Sammy Baugh, TCU (AP-1 [QB])
 John McCauley, Rice (AP-1 [HB])
 Bob Wilson, SMU (AP-1 [HB])
 Bill Wallace, Rice (AP-1 [FB])

Ends
 Walter Roach, TCU (AP-1)
 John Sylvester, Rice (AP-1)

Tackles
 Truman Spain, SMU (AP-1)
 Maurice Orr, SMU (AP-1)

Guards
 J. C. Wetsel, SMU (AP-1)
 Tracy Kellow, TCU (AP-1)

Centers
 Darrell Lester, TCU (AP-1)

Key
AP = Associated Press

See also
 1935 College Football All-America Team

References

All-Southwest Conference
All-Southwest Conference football teams